Brak may refer to:

Brak (title) (or Braque), former title for the kings of Waalo, part of present-day Senegal, West Africa
Brak (character), a character on 1966 Hanna-Barbera cartoon Space Ghost
The Brak Show, a 2000 animated series
Brak, a barbarian character in a series of stories (1965–1980) by John Jakes
Brak, a supporting character in the science fiction film This Island Earth (1955)
Brak, Libya, a city in Libya
Tell Brak, an ancient city in Syria
Syd Brak, South African illustrator

See also
Brack (disambiguation)